Brooks Pharmacy was a chain of more than 330 pharmacies located throughout New England and New York and was a well-recognized name in the New England pharmacy industry for several decades. The corporate headquarters were located in Warwick, Rhode Island.

During its heyday in the late 1990s and early 2000s, Brooks was one of the premier regional drug chains in the United States, and was the second largest drug chain in New England, maintaining an especially strong presence in the states of Vermont, New Hampshire, and Rhode Island. In 2002, Brooks was recipient of the 2002 Rex Awards Regional Chain of the Year.

However, Brooks faced many difficulties between 2004 and 2006, as its parent company struggled unsuccessfully to integrate 1,500 Eckerd stores acquired from J.C. Penney with the existing Brooks network, resulting in a steady loss of market share and lagging same-store sales as CVS and Walgreens continued to expand and solidify their store base in the New England region. On June 4, 2007, Brooks Pharmacy officially announced the sale of the pharmacy to Rite-Aid Pharmacy. The Brooks trade name, long associated with New England drug retailing, was retired.

History

Beginnings
Many trace Brooks Pharmacy's roots back to the defunct Adams Drug Company of Pawtucket, Rhode Island, a family owned operation founded in 1932 by the Salmanson Family. Adams acquired several stores under the Brooks Drug banner in Vermont and New York, and also operated stores under several other trade names throughout the Northeast.

In 1984, Pantry Pride, a Florida-based supermarket chain, acquired the Adams Drug Company, which then consisted of about 400 stores throughout the Northeast. The following year, all of Pantry Pride's assets, including Adams, were acquired by corporate raider Ronald Perelman's Revlon subsidiary. Shortly after the Perelman acquisition, in 1986, all Adams stores were converted to the Brooks trade name. For a period of time, ownership of Brooks was continually transferred between different Perelman-owned subsidiaries, including California-based Compact Video.

Acquisition by Hook-SupeRx
Perelman resold Brooks to the Indianapolis, Indiana-based Hook-SupeRx drug chain in 1988. Under the reign of Hook-SupeRx, Brooks assumed a new management team with Gayl W. Doster as COO, William Welsh in charge of operations, and David Morocco in charge of purchasing. They attempted to modernize the store base and turn around what had become a struggling chain. In 1991, Brooks developed the innovative RxWatch computerized prescription service, and in 1993, Brooks began an aggressive attempt to expand into the New York City suburbs in the lower Hudson Valley and southwestern Connecticut

Acquisitions by Revco and Jean Coutu
In 1994, Revco acquired Brooks as part of its larger purchase of the Hook-SupeRx chain. At the time, the Brooks store base stretched from Maine to Maryland. Revco had no interest in operating the Brooks outlets in New England, as they considered them outside of their core market. As a result, that same year, Revco sold all of the New England Brooks stores to the Quebec-based Jean Coutu Group, which had already been operating stores in Rhode Island and Massachusetts under the Maxi Drug and Douglas Drug trade names.

The Brooks stores retained by Revco outside of New England later assumed the Revco banner, while subsequently, Jean Coutu rebranded its Maxi and Douglas stores as Brooks. However, some former Maxi stores were placed under the combined Brooks-Maxi banner.

Growth, expansion, and innovation under Coutu
Under the management of Jean Coutu, Brooks was successful for several years, growing and acquiring smaller chains and pieces of larger chains throughout the New England region. In 1995, Brooks acquired Rite Aid's entire Massachusetts and Rhode Island store network. In exchange Brooks sold its entire store base in Maine to Rite Aid and exited the state. (Ironically, many Brooks stores in Massachusetts and Rhode Island would soon return to their original banner). In 1999, Brooks acquired the Burlington, Vermont-based City Drug chain, greatly increasing its market share in the state of Vermont and re-entering the state of New York for the first time since the 1994 Revco acquisition. Later, in 2001, Brooks purchased all of the New England Osco Drug stores from Albertson's. (The Osco name would be reintroduced to New England in 2005, following Albertson's acquisition of Shaw's and Star Market.)

During the late 1990s and early 2000s, Brooks Pharmacy was also seen as an innovator, being one of the first American chains to bring European derma care skin centers and consultation centers into its stores.

Merger with Eckerd
Shortly after the Osco acquisition, President Michel Coutu made a commitment to significantly increase the size of the chain by the year 2004. This expansion was accomplished in August 2004 with Coutu's acquisition of about 1,539 Eckerd Pharmacies as well as Eckerd's headquarters in Largo, Florida, from its then-parent company, J.C. Penney.

By 2005, Coutu had merged the operations of the Brooks and Eckerd chains together at Brooks headquarters in Warwick, Rhode Island, shuttering the former Eckerd headquarters in Florida. Between 2005 and 2006, Coutu ran into many difficulties integrating the Brooks and Eckerd chains together, and as a result, Coutu's Brooks and Eckerd outlets experienced a significant decline in market share.

Acquisition by Rite Aid
On August 23, 2006, The Wall Street Journal announced that Rite Aid would be buying the Eckerd and Brooks chains from Jean Coutu for US$3.4 billion. The acquisition included 1,854 stores, six distribution centers, and made Rite Aid the largest drugstore chain on the East Coast. The transaction was officially completed in June 2008. All Brooks and Eckerd locations were either rebranded as Rite Aid. To comply with FTC antitrust regulations, some Brooks/Eckerd locations within a mile of a Rite Aid store were sold to another pharmacy company, such as CVS/pharmacy or Walgreens, or were closed.

References

External links
Brooks Pharmacy website

CVS Health
Rite Aid
Defunct pharmacies of the United States
Retail companies established in 1932
Retail companies disestablished in 2007
2007 disestablishments in Rhode Island
1932 establishments in Rhode Island
Health care companies based in Rhode Island